The Belly Dancer is a 2001 Turkish drama film directed and written by Savaş Ay.

Cast
Çolpan İlhan as Kobra 
Savaş Ay as Necmi 
Kerem Alışık as Zorro 
Nilüfer Açıkalın as Emira 
İlknur Soydaş as Kanarya Hayriye 
Beyaz as Taxi Driver
Fedon as Gypsy chief 2
Sivga as Neptün 
Mustafa Altıoklar as Gypsy chief 1
Nuran Sultan as Zarife 
Panter Emel as Dekora 
Fikret Kuşkan as Jesus Christ 
Sadri Alışık as Tolgay

External links

Belly dance costumes

2001 films
2000s Turkish-language films
2001 drama films
Films set in Turkey
Turkish drama films